Used is a municipality in province of Zaragoza, Aragon, Spain. According to the 2010 census (INE), the municipality has a population of 328 inhabitants.

It is located in the Campo de Daroca comarca near the Sierra de Santa Cruz.

References

External links
Official Website

 auto

Municipalities in the Province of Zaragoza